Brian Christopher Williams is  an American politician who is a member of the Missouri Senate from the 14th district in St. Louis County. Williams is the first African American male elected to the Missouri Senate in 20 years.

Career
Williams won a contested three-way primary election on August 7, 2018.  Williams was elected unopposed in the general election on November 6, 2018 as a member of Democratic Party.

Electoral history

State Senate

References

Democratic Party Missouri state senators
Living people
21st-century American politicians
1983 births
Politicians from St. Louis County, Missouri